Lyrical dance is a dance style that embodies various aspects of ballet, jazz, acrobatics, and modern dance. The style combines ballet technique with the freedom and musicality of jazz and contemporary. According to Jennifer Fisher, lyrical dance is “strongly associated with clearly displayed emotional moods, fast-moving choreographic strategies, emphasis on virtuosic display, illustration of song lyrics, and, in group form, exact unison.”  The style is usually danced at a faster pace than ballet but not as fast as jazz. Lyrical dance is a category typically found in dance competitions.

History
There is little research and documentation of the origins of lyrical dance most likely due to the limited use of this style outside of the competition dance world. There are three popular origin stories for lyrical dance that have been suggested by experts of competition dance. The first, speculated by Jimmy Peters, is that lyrical dance evolved from the "dream ballet" in musicals such as Oklahoma and West Side Story. The second from Chelya Clawson, states that this term can be traced back to 16th century traditional Indian dance. The last, and the most plausible, created by Phyllis Balanga- Demoret, is that it began about 25 years ago as a result of ballet's inability to take to the competition stage. Even though there has been no official documentation, Balanga-Demoret's explanation is the most plausible because lyrical dance is only used in competition dance. Additionally, ballet is rarely seen on a competitive stage, despite it having its own category at many competitions, which further confirms Balanga-Demoret's theory.
Dancer, teacher, and choreographer Suzi Taylor, who holds regular classes at Steps on Broadway in New York City, is considered by many to be an early mother of lyrical dance, having emphasized a unique brand of musicality and expressiveness which influenced many future teachers and choreographers.

The styles within lyrical dance have changed over time. In the earlier stages, a dancer would perform the lyrics of a song, displaying emotions. Today, the lyrical category still has an emphasis on displaying emotion but in a more abstract way. The lyrical category is a place for innovation and stylized movement that is associated with contemporary dance. Lyrical dancing is performed to music with lyrics to inspire movements to express strong feelings and emotions the choreographer feels from the lyrics in the chosen song. Because lyrical dancing focuses on the expression of strong emotion, the style concentrates more on individual approach and expressiveness than the precision of the dancer's movements. Because of this, there is not as much focus on the choreography, and, in fact, the choreography often exists only as a general guide for the dancer, not as a routine that has to be exactly followed.

Style vs technique 

Because of the links between the styles of dance, teachers originally struggled with whether to teach lyrical dance alongside jazz or ballet or as its own, separate style. The main concerns with lyrical dance is the distinction between lyrical as a style and/or a technique. Lyrical has been described as a "pseudostyle" or a "pseudogenre" because it utilizes steps from other, more established styles of dance. Lyrical dance utilizes training from jazz technique, ballet technique, and modern technique as a basis for movement. These well-known movements are elongated, taken off their center, and distorted to create a new aesthetic in lyrical. Although advertised by some studios as a class, “lyrical technique” does not technically exist. A dancer cannot be proficient in lyrical dance without knowledge and mastery of basic technique from jazz, ballet, and modern.

Use in popular culture

Lyrical dance is competition dance style and is only used to describe a specific style of dance in the world of competitive dance. “Lyrical” is used to describe a quality or movement type in other dance settings, but not as a style name such as Jazz or Ballet. There has only been one instance of lyrical being used in a professional setting. This was on Season 1 of the popular American dance show So You Think You Can Dance. Contestants on this reality show were asked to compete in many different styles such as ballroom, hip-hop, jazz, and lyrical. The term lyrical was replaced by the term contemporary in Season 2 of the show. This was thought to have been done to professionally legitimize this show. Despite the name change, the type of dances performed in this style remain very similar.

See also
 Lyrical ballet

References

Contemporary dance
Jazz dance